The Women's under-23 time trial at the 2015 European Road Championships took place on 6 August. The Championships were hosted by the Estonian city Tartu. The course was 18.4 km long. 28 cyclists competed in the time trial. The course had a total elevation of 53m, with a maximal inclination of 5.1% and a maximal slope downhill of 4.9%.

The race was won by Mieke Kröger, who also won the time trial in 2014 in a time of 24' 57" with an average speed of 44.25 km/hour.

Top 10 final classification

See also
 2015 European Road Championships – Women's under-23 road race

References

European Road Championships – Women's U23 time trial
2015 European Road Championships
2015 in women's road cycling